

Lamar Cardinals tennis 

The Lamar Cardinals tennis team is the men's team representing Lamar University in the sport of tennis. The team started competition at the four year college level in 1952.  The Cardinals compete in NCAA Division I's Southland Conference. Home matches are at the 16 court on campus Thompson Family Tennis Center in Beaumont, Texas.  Scott Shankles has been the Cardinals' head coach since the 2010-11 season.

Championships

The Cardinals have won championships ranging from the conference level up to the national level.  At the national level, the Cardinals won the NAIA National Championship in Singles and Doubles in 1955, 1956, 1957, 1958.  The Cardinals also won the NAIA singles championship in 1959, and 1960.  At the NCAA College Division level, the Cardinals won the National Singles Championship in 1967.  The Cardinals won an NCAA College Division Regional Championship in both Singles and Doubles 1962.  At the NCAA Division I level, the Cardinals won three Southland Conference tournament championships and represented the Southland Conference in the NCAA Division I Men's Tennis tournament in 2016, 2017, and 2018.  The Cardinals also won the Southland Conference regular season championship at the NCAA Division I level (1975, 1976, 2016, and 2017).  The Cardinals won the WAC regular season championship in 2022.

In addition, Lamar won the Southland Conference regular season championship at the NCAA College Division level (1967 and 1973); at the NCAA Division II level (1974); and at the NCAA Division I level (1975, 1976, 2016, and 2017).

Honors

Southland Conference Player of the Year
 Jakob Paulsen – 2003
 Filip Kanczula – 2008
 Michael Feucht – 2016

Western Athletic Conofernce Player of the Year
 Sancho Arbizu – 2022

Southland Conference Newcomer of the Year
 Filip Kanczula – 2006

Southland Conference Freshman of the Year
 Jakob Paulsen – 2002
 Benny Scheiwzer – 2015

Western Athletic Conference Freshman of the Year
 Sancho Arbizu – 2022

Southland Conference Coach of the Year
 Ron Westbrooks – 1973, '75, '76, '82
 Scott Shankles – 2016

Western Athletic Conference Coach of the Year
 Scott Shankles – 2022

Year-by-Year Results

Sources:

Head coaching history

 Records not available
Source:

Postseason results

NCAA Division I

Lamar Lady Cardinals tennis

The Lamar Lady Cardinals tennis team is the women's team representing Lamar University in the sport of tennis. The team started competition around 1968.  The Lady Cardinals compete in NCAA Division I's Southland Conference. Home matches are at the 16 court on campus Thompson Family Tennis Center in Beaumont, Texas.  David Wong has been the Lady Cardinals' head coach since the 2001 season.

The team competed with the Association of Intercollegiate Athletics for Women until 1981 when it began competition as an NCAA Division I team. In AIAW competition, the doubles team of Cathy Beene and Linda Rupert won the National AIAW Doubles championship in 1973. Beene and Rupert also captured four Texas AIAW Singles championships (Beene – 1970, 71 and Rupert – 1972, 73) and two Texas AIAW Doubles championships (1972, 73). In NCAA competition, the Lady Cardinals have won two Southland Conference championships (1983 and 1985), one Southland Conference tournament championship (2008), and one American South Conference championship (1988).

Honors

Southland Conference Player of the Year
 Andrea Martinez – 2006
 Mariaryeni Gutiérrez – 2010
 Katya Lapayeva – 2016

Southland Conference Newcomer of the Year
 Pamela Martinez – 2006
 Carolina Salas – 2012

Southland Conference Freshman of the Year
 Kaltrina Harbuzi – 2007
 Mariaryeni Gutiérrez – 2008

Southland Conference Coach of the Year
 Ron Westbrooks – 1973, '75, '76, '82
 Scott Shankles – 2016

Lamar Lady Cardinal Career Coaching Records

Note:  Overall is misstated since it is based only on available records.  Records for at least seven seasons of the program beginning are unavailable.

Stadium

Thompson Family Tennis Center

The Thompson Family Tennis Center was completely renovated in 2009.  The center has 16 outside courts including 5 stadium courts with covered seating for 400.  Additional seating for over 600 spectators is provided for the remaining eleven courts.  The center features an electronic scoreboard capable of scoring six matches at once.  The tennis support building includes a pro shop/meeting room, locker rooms, restrooms, and storage room.

References

External links
 Lamar Cardinals Tennis official website
 Thompson Family Tennis Center